Marretje Arents (c. 1712–28 June 1748 Amsterdam), known as Mat van den Nieuwendijk, and het limoenwijf (i.e. the limewoman), was a Dutch fishwife and rebellion leader, sentenced to death as one of the three instigators and leaders responsible for the so-called Pachter riots of 1748.

The Pachter riots were caused by tax conflicts and began in Amsterdam on 17 June 1748. The discontent escalated on 24 June; during two days 19 (or 36) houses of landlords were plundered. Arents was quoted saying that they had plans to conquer the Stadhuis op de Dam (city hall) and proclaim a revolution.

References

 DVN, een project van Huygens ING en OGC (UU). Bronvermelding: Maarten Hell, Arents, Marretje, in: Digitaal Vrouwenlexicon van Nederland. URL: http://resources.huygens.knaw.nl/vrouwenlexicon/lemmata/data/Arents [13/01/2014]

1712 births
1748 deaths
18th-century Dutch people
Executed Dutch women
Dutch rebels
18th-century executions by the Netherlands
Criminals from Amsterdam
18th-century Dutch criminals
Fishmongers (people)
18th-century rebels